Aster latifolius is an unaccepted scientific name and may refer to two different species of plants:
 Eurybia macrophylla, the largeleaf aster
 Oclemena acuminata, the whorled wood aster